Ninh Bình is a small city in the Red River Delta of northern Vietnam. It is the capital of Ninh Bình Province.

Geography
Ninh Bình Province is located in northern Vietnam comprising 48 square kilometres; the 2007 city population was 130,517.

It takes 2 hours by coach to travel from Hanoi to Ninh Bình.

History

During the Nguyen dynasty, in August 1884 in the Tonkin campaign, the allegiance of Ninh Bình was of considerable importance to the French, as artillery mounted in its lofty citadel controlled river traffic to the Gulf of Tonkin. Although the Vietnamese authorities in Ninh Bình made no attempt to hinder the passage of an expedition launched by Henri Rivière in March 1883 to capture Nam Định, they were known to be hostile towards the French. In November 1883, on the eve of the Sơn Tây campaign, the French occupied the citadel of Ninh Bình without resistance and installed a garrison.

Climate
Ninh Bình experiences a humid subtropical climate with mild winters and hot, humid summers.

References

External links

 

Provincial capitals in Vietnam
Populated places in Ninh Bình province
Districts of Ninh Bình province
Cities in Vietnam